Nash Vesnik (Macedonian Cyrillic: Наш Весник) was a local regional newspaper in the Socialist Federal Republic of Yugoslavia and later the Republic of Macedonia, now known as North Macedonia. First it was a monthly newspaper. Because of a great interest, it started to be published twice a month. Since April 1970 it was published weekly every Friday and since 1971 it became an official newspaper of the local government in Kumanovo. In 1989 the responsibility of the newspaper went to the Assembly of Macedonia.

The newspaper was financially supported by the government. In 2018 the Director of the local Library in Kumanovo has announced that the newspaper will be digitized and available for reading in the library.

See also
 TV Kumanovo

References

1961 establishments in the Socialist Republic of Macedonia
2001 disestablishments in the Republic of Macedonia
Publications established in 1961
Publications disestablished in 2001
Macedonian-language newspapers
Mass media in Kumanovo
Newspapers published in North Macedonia
Newspapers published in Yugoslavia
Weekly newspapers